Marina Arcade is a completed  skyscraper built in Dubai Marina, Dubai,  UAE from 2014-2017. The tower cost AED 1.25 billion to build, the building will contain residents shopping avenues, gymnasium, spa and residential amenities.

See also
 List of tallest buildings in Dubai

References

External links

Emporis.com
Realtyna.com
ProTenders.com
marinaarcade.ae

Residential skyscrapers in Dubai